Gubadag is a city in Boldumsaz District in Daşoguz Province of  Turkmenistan. Gubadag is known for its special round meat pie, known as fitchi. The city is located on the border with Karakalpakstan (Uzbekistan), near Mang‘it. 

Until December 1938 the city was named Täzä-Kala. From 1938 until 1949 it was called Town Named for Thälmann, a russification of the last name of Ernst Thälmann (1886-1944), a German Communist involved in the international communist movement.  In 1949 this was abbreviated to Telmansk. The name was changed to Gubadag in 1993 by Presidential Decree No. 1327.

Etymology
Frank's and Touch-Werner's dictionary defines guba as "reddish-brown" and dag as "mountain". Atanyyazow asserts the name derives from the reddish-brown hills in the vicinity.

References

Populated places in Daşoguz Region